Alicia Shanice Ogoms (born 2 April 1994) is a Canadian female volleyball player. She was part of the Canada women's national volleyball team, and participated at the 2017 FIVB Volleyball Women's World Grand Prix, 2018 FIVB Volleyball Women's World Championship, 2019 Women's Challenge Cup, 2020 NORCECA Women's Tokyo Qualification Tournament, 2021 Volleyball Nations League, 2022 Volleyball Nations League, 2022 FIVA Women's Volleyball World Championship. She played for the University of Southern California.

Clubs 

 2017 –  PTPS Piła
 2018 –  SAB Volley
 2019 –  MKS Kalisz
 2020 –  Bjelsko Biala
 2021 –  Firenze
 2021-22 –  Bergamo
 2022-23 –  TFOC

References

External links 
 FIVB profile
 Alicia Ogoms Volleyball Canada page
 Alicia Ogoms Canadian Olympic page
 

Living people
1994 births
Canadian women's volleyball players
Middle blockers
Canadian expatriate sportspeople in Poland
Canadian expatriate sportspeople in Italy
Canadian expatriate sportspeople in the United States
USC Trojans women's volleyball players
Expatriate volleyball players in Poland
Expatriate volleyball players in Italy
Expatriate volleyball players in the United States
Volleyball players from Winnipeg
Volleyball players at the 2019 Pan American Games
Pan American Games competitors for Canada